The 1990–91 Minnesota North Stars season was the North Stars' 24th season. The most striking aspect of the season was that despite qualifying for the playoffs with an under–.500 (or "losing") regular-season record, the team reached the Stanley Cup Final as the Clarence Campbell Conference Champions, eliminating Chicago and St. Louis (each in six games) teams that had finished nearly 40 points ahead of them in the regular season, as well as the defending Stanley Cup champion Edmonton Oilers in five games — a classic "Cinderella" post-season. The North Stars saw their playoff run end in game 6 of the Stanley Cup finals when they lost to the Pittsburgh Penguins 8–0 in front of their home fans in the Met Center.

Offseason
Weeks after their first-round loss to the Chicago Blackhawks, owners George and Gordon Gund sold the North Stars to a consortium led by Howard Baldwin, in exchange for purchasing the expansion franchise that would become the San Jose Sharks. Baldwin and his partners Morris Belzberg and Norman Green agreed to continue operating the North Stars in the Met Center, while opening negotiations with the owners of the NBA's Minnesota Timberwolves for an opportunity to invest in the team, or possibly share the Wolves' upcoming arena in the future.

NHL Draft

Regular season

Final standings

Schedule and results

Transactions

Trades

Player statistics

Skaters
Note: GP = Games played; G = Goals; A = Assists; Pts = Points; PIM = Penalties in minutes

Goaltending
Note: GP = Games played; MIN = Minutes; W = Wins; L = Losses; T = Ties; SO = Shutouts; GAA = Goals against average

Playoffs

Norris Division Semi-Finals

Norris Division Finals

Campbell Conference Finals

Stanley Cup Finals
Pittsburgh Penguins vs. Minnesota North Stars

Pittsburgh  wins best-of-seven series 4–2

Awards and records
 Clarence S. Campbell Bowl

References
 North Stars on Hockey Database

1990–91 NHL season by team
1990–91 in American ice hockey by team
1990-91
1990-91
1991 Stanley Cup
Minne
1990 in sports in Minnesota